This is a list of Buffalo Bulls football players in the NFL Draft.

Key

Selections

References

Buffalo

Buffalo Bulls NFL Draft